Presidential elections were held in the Gambia on 22 September 2006. Incumbent President Yahya Jammeh was re-elected with 67.3% of the vote. Ousainou Darboe, who finished second with 27% of the vote, rejected the official results, saying that the elections had not been free and fair and that there was widespread voter intimidation.

Electoral system
All the 989 polling booths used marbles, which were inserted into candidate drums instead of ballot papers due to the high illiteracy rate. The marble system is only used in Gambia, where it has been used since 1965.

Results

References

Further reading

Gambian presidential election
2006
Presidential election
Gambian presidential election
Election and referendum articles with incomplete results